The House of Commons (Redistribution of Seats) Act 1944 (7 & 8 Geo.6. c.41) was an Act of the Parliament of the United Kingdom that established permanent boundary commissions for each of the constituent countries of the United Kingdom, and provided for the periodic review of the number and boundaries of parliamentary constituencies.

The Act established the membership of each commission, the procedures to be followed by the commissions, and the rules for the redistribution of seats for the commissions to observe.  The commissions' initial reviews of constituencies under the Act were implemented by the Representation of the People Act 1948.

Speaker's Conference and resultant legislation
The rules continuing into the 21st century for the redistributions of seats in the House Commons evolved from the Speaker's Conference in 1944. The Conference recommended an electoral quota for Great Britain
calculated from the electorate and a 25 per cent tolerance on either side and that the total number of Members of the House of Commons should remain substantially the same with the Northern Ireland seats fixed at 12; the number of Scottish seats should be not less than 71 and the number of Welsh seats not less than 35. This was swiftly enacted in the House of Commons (Redistribution of Seats) Act 1944. In the period 1944 to 1958, the primacy of equality rule was diluted in five ways by further legislation:
Abolition of strict 25 per cent rule
Introduction of separate quotas for England, Wales and Scotland
Greater presumption against inconveniences of disruption.
Mandatory local inquiries in certain circumstances
A longer period between reviews of 10 to 15 years, rather than 3 to 7
Thereafter, the Rules were only subject to minor change by statute, mainly to take account of changes in local authority structures.

The boundary commissions

The Speaker of the House of Commons was to be the chairman of each of the four commissions. The remaining members were as follows:

Boundary Commission for England
The Registrar General of Births, Deaths and Marriages in England
The Director General of the Ordnance Survey
One member appointed by the Home Secretary
One member appointed by the Minister of Health

Boundary Commission for Scotland
The Registrar General of Births, Deaths and Marriages in Scotland
The Director General of the Ordnance Survey
Two members appointed by the Secretary of State for Scotland

Boundary Commission for Wales
The Registrar General of Births, Deaths and Marriages in England
The Director General of the Ordnance Survey
One member appointed by the Home Secretary
One member appointed by the Minister of Health
(For the purposes of the Act Wales included Monmouthshire)

Boundary Commission for Northern Ireland
The Registrar General of Births, Deaths and Marriages for Northern Ireland
The Commissioner of Valuation for Northern Ireland
Two other members appointed by the Home Secretary

No member of the Commons, or of either house of the Parliament of Northern Ireland was qualified to be a commissioner, and any serving commissioner would be disqualified on becoming a member of any of these bodies.

Rules for redistribution of seats
The Act contained a number of rules to guide the work of the commissions.

Number of constituencies
Great Britain was to have "not substantially greater or less than" 591 constituencies.
Scotland  was to have not less than 71 constituencies.
Wales was to have not less than 35 constituencies.
Northern Ireland was to have 12 constituencies.

Rules on dividing and combining counties and districts
"As far as practicable" in England and Wales: 
No county (or any part thereof) was to be included in a constituency with the whole or part of any other county, or part of a county borough or a metropolitan borough.
No county borough (or any part thereof) was to be included in a constituency with any other county borough or part of a metropolitan borough.
No metropolitan borough was to be included in a constituency which included the whole or part of any other metropolitan borough.
No county district (municipal borough, urban district or rural district) was to be included partly in one constituency and partly in another.

In Scotland:
No county or burgh could be partly in one parliamentary county and partly in another, or be divided between a parliamentary county and a parliamentary burgh.
No burgh other than a county of a city was to be divided between constituencies.

In Northern Ireland: 
No county district was to be included partly in one constituency and partly in another.

Electorate
The electorate of any constituency should not differ from the "electoral quota" by more than 25%.

The electoral quota was obtained by dividing the total electorate for either Great Britain or Northern Ireland by the number of allocated seats.

Special geographical considerations
Each commission were allowed to depart from the rules on areas or electorate in special cases "including in particular the size, shape and accessibility of a constituency" in order to form constituencies.

Amendment and repeal
The 1944 Act was amended by the House of Commons (Redistribution of Seats) Act 1947, and succeeded by the House of Commons (Redistribution of Seats) Act 1949 which amended the rules for the redistribution of seats, but did not change the membership or procedures of the commissions.

References

United Kingdom Acts of Parliament 1944
Acts of the Parliament of the United Kingdom concerning the House of Commons
Constituencies of the Parliament of the United Kingdom
1944 in the United Kingdom
1944 in politics